Trębki Stare  is a village in the administrative district of Gmina Zakroczym, within Nowy Dwór County, Masovian Voivodeship, in east-central Poland.

In the years 1975–1998, the village belonged to the Warsaw Voivodeship.

Demographics

References

Villages in Nowy Dwór Mazowiecki County